The year 1844 in science and technology involved some significant events, listed below.

Astronomy
 Friedrich Bessel explains the wobbling motions of Sirius and Procyon by suggesting that these stars have dark companions.

Biology
 June 3 – The last definitely recorded pair of great auks (Pinguinus impennis) are killed on the Icelandic island of Eldey.
 August 1 – Opening of Berlin Zoological Garden.
 Gabriel Gustav Valentin notes the digestive activity of pancreatic juice.
 George Robert Gray begins publication in London of The Genera of Birds.
 Joseph Dalton Hooker begins publication of The Botany of the Antarctic Voyage of H.M. Discovery Ships Erebus and Terror ... 1839–1843 in London.

Chemistry
 Karl Klaus discovers ruthenium.
 Professor Gustaf Erik Pasch of Stockholm is granted the privilege of manufacturing a safety match.
 French chemist Adolphe Wurtz reports the first synthesis of copper hydride, a well-known reducing agent and catalyst in organic chemistry.

Earth sciences
 Robert Chambers publishes Vestiges of the Natural History of Creation (anonymously).

Mathematics
 Joseph Liouville finds the first transcendental number
 Hermann Grassmann studies vectors with more than three dimensions.

Medicine
 Irish physician Francis Rynd utilises a hollow hypodermic needle to make the first recorded subcutaneous injections, specifically of a sedative to treat neuralgia.

Metrology
 Joseph Whitworth introduces the thou.

Physics
 William Robert Grove publishes The Correlation of Physical Forces, the first comprehensive account of the conservation of energy.

Technology
 January 30 – Charles Goodyear patents the vulcanisation of rubber in the United States.
 May 11 – Samuel Morse sends the first message using Morse code.
 June – Henry Fox Talbot commences publication of the first book illustrated with photographs from a camera, The Pencil of Nature.
 Uriah A. Boyden develops an improved outward-flow water turbine.
 Robert Bunsen invents the grease-spot photometer.
 Thomas and Caleb Pratt design the Pratt truss bridge.
 Dublin iron-founder Richard Turner begins assembling components for the Palm house at Kew Gardens in London, the first large-scale structural use of wrought iron.
 Egide Walschaerts of the Belgian State Railways originates Walschaerts valve gear for the steam locomotive.

Events
 July 27 – Death of English chemist and physicist John Dalton in Manchester where his body lies in honour in the Town Hall and more than 40,000 people file past his coffin.

Awards
 Copley Medal: Carlo Matteucci
 Wollaston Medal for Geology: William Conybeare

Births
 February 1 – G. Stanley Hall (died 1924), American psychologist.
 February 7 – Alexei Pavlovich Fedchenko (died 1873), Russian naturalist.
 February 20 – Ludwig Boltzmann (died 1906), Austrian physicist famous for the invention of statistical mechanics.
 March 25 – Adolf Engler (died 1930), German botanist.
 June 10 – Carl Hagenbeck (died 1913), German zoologist.
 July 1 – H. Newell Martin (died 1896),  British physiologist.
 August 6 – James Henry Greathead (died 1896), South African-born English civil engineer.
 August 13 – Friedrich Miescher (died 1895), Swiss biochemist.
 August 22 – George W. DeLong (died 1881), American Arctic explorer.
 September 11 – Henry Alleyne Nicholson (died 1899), English paleontologist and zoologist.
 October 3 – Patrick Manson (died 1922), Scottish parasitologist, the "father of tropical medicine" .
 October 28 – Mary Katharine Brandegee née Layne (died 1920), American botanist.
 November 25 – Karl Benz (died 1929), German automotive engineer.
 Varvara Rudneva (d. 1899), Russian physician.

Deaths
 June 19 – Étienne Geoffroy Saint-Hilaire (born 1772), French naturalist.
 July 27 – John Dalton (born 1766), English chemist and physicist.
 August 30 – Francis Baily (born 1774), English astronomer.
 December 28 – Thomas Henderson (born 1798), Scottish astronomer.

References

 
19th century in science
1840s in science